Joyce Jacobson Kaufman (June 21, 1929 - August 26, 2016) was an American chemist known for advancing the science of quantum chemistry and for clinical research on anaesthetics. Born to an immigrant family in the Bronx and educated at Johns Hopkins University, she worked at the Sorbonne and at Martin Marietta before returning to Johns Hopkins.

She was elected as a fellow of the American Institute of Chemists in 1965, and of the American Physical Society in 1966. Her other accolades include the 1973 Garvan Medical Award of the American Chemical Society and the Legion of Honour in 1969.

References

Further reading

Physical Chemistry Pathfinder Biography of Kaufman

1929 births
2016 deaths
Jewish chemists
American women chemists
Members of the European Academy of Sciences and Arts
Martin Marietta people
21st-century American women